Trilochan Bhatta was sworn in as Chief Minister of Sudurpashchim Province on 16 February 2018. Here is the list of ministers.

Chief Minister & Cabinet Ministers

Former Arrangement

May 2021 - April 2022

February 2018 - May 2021

Member by party

See also 

 Sudurpashchim Province
 1st Sudurpashchim Provincial Assembly

References

External links 

 Office of Chief Minister and Council of Ministers of Sudurpashchim Province

Provincial cabinets of Nepal
2018 establishments in Nepal
Government of Sudurpashchim Province